Kenneth Dewayne "KJ" Jefferson Jr. (born May 20, 2001) is an American football quarterback for the Arkansas Razorbacks.

High school career
Jefferson attended North Panola High School in Sardis, Mississippi. He finished his high school career with 9,582 passing yards, 2,922 rushing yards and 143 total touchdowns. A four-star prospect, he committed to play college football at the University of Arkansas.

College career
Jefferson spent his true freshman year at Arkansas in 2019 as a backup to Nick Starkel. He made his first career start against the LSU Tigers. For the season he completed 14 of 31 passes for 197 yards with one interception and also rushed for two touchdowns. As a redshirt freshman in 2020, he was the backup to	Feleipe Franks. He appeared in five games and made one start for an injured Franks. He finished the season completing 20 of 41 passes for 295 yards, three passing touchdowns and two rushing touchdowns. Jefferson entered the 2021 season as the starter. 

Jefferson started all twelve games for Arkansas in 2021, helping the Razorbacks finish the season 8-4 overall record, 4-4 in SEC games. This included a non-conference victory over the Texas Longhorns, and trophy game wins over the Texas A&M Aggies (Southwest Classic Trophy), LSU Tigers (Golden Boot Trophy), and Missouri Tigers (Battle Line Rivalry Trophy). It was the first time in team history that Arkansas had won all three trophy games in the same season. Jefferson started for Arkansas in their season-ending Outback Bowl game versus Penn State, and led the Razorbacks to a 24-10 victory, and a 9-4 final record. Jefferson was named the 2022 Outback Bowl MVP. His final season statistics after the bowl game were 2,676 yards passing for 21 touchdowns and only 4 interceptions, while completing 67.3 percent of his passes for a QB efficiency rating of 164.7. He also rushed 146 times for 664 yards and 6 rushing touchdowns, all team highs. 

Jefferson was again Arkansas' starting QB in 2022, starting twelve of the Razorbacks thirteen games. He lead Arkansas to an overall record of 7-6, 3-5 in SEC play. Four of Arkansas' six losses (Texas A&M, Liberty, LSU, Missouri) were by a grand total of nine points. Jefferson sat out the LSU game due to injury. He guided Arkansas to their second straight bowl victory, beating the Kansas Jayhawks in an exciting 2022 Liberty Bowl, 55-53 in 3OT. Jefferson was named the Liberty Bowl MVP, completing 19 of 29 passes for 287 yards and 2 TDs, and rushing for 130 yards and 2 rushing TDs on 14 carries. He finished the season with a QB efficiency rating of 165.2, slightly better than the previous season. Jefferson has announced that he will return to Arkansas for his redshirt senior season in 2023. He is expected to compete for All-SEC honors, and many college football experts believe Jefferson could be a pre-season Heisman Trophy hopeful.

Statistics

References

External links
Arkansas Razorbacks bio

2001 births
Living people
People from Sardis, Mississippi
Players of American football from Mississippi
American football quarterbacks
Arkansas Razorbacks football players
African-American players of American football